RTI(-4229)-336, (LS-193,309, (−)-2β-(3-(4-methylphenyl)isoxazol-5-yl)-3β-(4-chlorophenyl)tropane) is a phenyltropane derivative which acts as a potent and selective dopamine reuptake inhibitor and stimulant drug. It binds to the dopamine transporter with around 20x the affinity of cocaine, however it produces relatively mild stimulant effects, with a slow onset and long duration of action. (however other sources class it as having among the faster onsets of action from among phenyltropanes) These characteristics make it a potential candidate for treatment of cocaine addiction, as a possible substitute drug analogous to how methadone is used for treating heroin abuse. RTI-336 fully substitutes for cocaine in addicted monkeys and supports self-administration, and significantly reduces rates of cocaine use, especially when combined with SSRIs, and research is ongoing to determine whether it could be a viable substitute drug in human cocaine addicts.

Update
Lower reinforcing strength of the phenyltropane cocaine analogs RTI-336 and RTI-177 compared to cocaine in nonhuman primates.

Influence of chronic dopamine transporter inhibition by RTI-336 on motor behavior, sleep and hormone levels in rhesus monkeys.

Pharmacotherapy for Cocaine Abuse
Development of the Dopamine Transporter Selective RTI-336 as a Pharmacotherapy for Cocaine Abuse (FIC, et al. 2006).

N.B. RTI-371

See also 
 RTI-177
 List of cocaine analogues

References 

Chloroarenes
Tropanes
RTI compounds
Dopamine reuptake inhibitors
Stimulants
Isoxazoles